The Second Gorton ministry (Liberal–Country Coalition) was the 45th ministry of the Government of Australia. It was led by the country's 19th Prime Minister, John Gorton. The Second Gorton ministry succeeded the First Gorton ministry, which dissolved on 12 November 1969 following the federal election that took place in October. The ministry was replaced by the McMahon ministry on 10 March 1971 following the resignation of Gorton.

As of 26 January 2023, Tom Hughes is last surviving Liberal member of the Second Gorton ministry, while Ian Sinclair and Peter Nixon are the last surviving Country members. Malcolm Fraser was the last surviving Liberal Cabinet minister.

Cabinet

Outer ministry

See also
 First Gorton Ministry

Notes

Ministries of Elizabeth II
Gorton, 2
1969 establishments in Australia
1971 disestablishments in Australia
Cabinets established in 1969
Cabinets disestablished in 1971